Cadshaw is a village in the unitary borough of Blackburn with Darwen, in Lancashire, England.

Villages in Lancashire
Geography of Blackburn with Darwen